Derek Wilbraham Pritchard, Baron Pritchard (8 June 1910 – 18 October 1995) was a British businessman and life peer.

Biography 
Pritchard was knighted in 1968 and created a life peer, as Baron Pritchard, of West Haddon in Northamptonshire on 30 January 1975.

References 
 "Lord Pritchard", The Times, 18 October 1995.

Knights Bachelor
1995 deaths
British businesspeople
Deputy Lieutenants
Life peers
1910 births
Life peers created by Elizabeth II